The 1979 Fort Lauderdale Strikers season was part of the club's twelfth season in professional soccer.

Background 
This was not the first instance of the Strikers playing indoors. Their first ever match, indoor or out, was an exhibition match played on February 27, 1977, versus their arch-rival, Tampa Bay Rowdies at the Bayfront Center. In January 1978 they played the Washington Diplomats indoors at the D.C. Armory on back-to-back days. The Strikers lost all of three of these matches.

Review 
In January 1979 four NASL teams participated in the Budweiser Indoor Soccer Invitational at the Bayfront Center in St. Petersburg, Florida.  The teams were the Dallas Tornado, Ft. Lauderdale Strikers, Tulsa Roughnecks, and the host, Tampa Bay Rowdies.  The event was held over two days. The Strikers finished the tournament in fourth place. The team wore a very basic, green and white, adidas uniform for the invitational. It was very similar to the away kit that the West German national team wore during that era, except that the Strikers's numbers on the backs were red and there was no team crest of any kind on the front of the jerseys.

Competitions

NASL indoor regular season

Budweiser Indoor Soccer Invitational

* Dallas wins title on goal differential

Results summaries 
Session 1: January 27, 1979
 

Session 2: January 28, 1979

Match reports

Statistics

Transfers

Strikers' indoor matches prior to 1979

References 

1978
Fort Lauderdale Strikers
Fort Lauderdale Strikers indoor
Fort Lauderdale Strikers